Mississippi College School of Law (MC Law or MC Law School) is an American Bar Association accredited law school. MC Law is one of only two law schools in the state of Mississippi, and is the only law school in the capital city of Jackson, Mississippi. The school is a professional school of Mississippi College, founded in 1826.

History

The law school was founded in 1930 as the Jackson School of Law.  In 1975, the law school was acquired by Mississippi College.  In 1980, subsequent to the merger between Mississippi College and the law school, MC Law gained full ABA accreditation.  MC Law is one of two law schools in the state of Mississippi, and the only law school in the capital, Jackson.  Since 1990, MC Law has been a member of the Association of American Law Schools (AALS).

On May 15, 2020, the council of the American Bar Association’s Section of Legal Education and Admissions to the Bar met remotely and determined this school and nine others had significant noncompliance with Standard 316. This Standard was revised in 2019 to provide that at least 75% of an accredited law school’s graduates who took a bar exam must pass one within two years of graduation. The school was asked to submit a report by Feb. 1, 2021; and, if the council did not find the report demonstrated compliance, the school would be asked to appear before the council at its May, 2021 meeting.  Compliance with the 75% standard had not been demonstrated by statistics released by the ABA at the end of April, 2021, which showed the college with a 73.83% pass rate for 2018 graduates, compared with 72.64% for 2017 graduates.  However, the council found on May 18 that the college had demonstrated compliance based on data for 2019 graduates, for whom the pass rate was 79.2%.

Campus

The Mississippi College School of Law is located in the heart of the historic sector of downtown Jackson, within walking distance of City Hall, the Mississippi Supreme Court, the Federal District Courts, the Governor’s Mansion, and a number of government and private law firm offices.

In December 2005, MC Law completed a massive construction and renovation project, which more than doubled the size of the original campus.  A new classroom building was added along with an auditorium building.  The Law Library occupies three floors in the Law School’s West Wing, and contains one of the largest Mississippi collections of legal books, journals and microforms including statutes, court reports, digests, encyclopedias, treatises, loose-leaf services, periodicals and government documents.  Beginning in 2013, the Law Library is also the repository of the Mississippi Legislature’s video archive footage.  The main campus for Mississippi College is located about 15 miles to the west in Clinton, Mississippi.

Academics

The 2022 entering class had an enrollment of 126, with an LSAT median score of 150 and a median GPA of 3.38. The average age at enrollment is 25.7. 59 colleges and universities are represented, along with 16 states.

In addition to offering courses in common law, Mississippi College School of Law also offers a certificate in Louisiana Civil Law, which prepares the recipient for practice in the state of Louisiana by offering courses such as Successions and Donations, Obligations, Louisiana Civil Procedure, and Civil Law Property.  MC Law is one of the only law schools to offer Civil Law training in addition to its Common Law curriculum.

MC Law has more than 25 full-time faculty members in all major disciplines of law, with more than 20% of the faculty holding a PhD or equivalent degree, and more than 50% of the faculty with an LL.M. or Masters in a specialized field. The Law School provides a national certificate programs for Civil Law training, and hosts six centers, the Mississippi College Law Review, and a Moot Court program.  The Law School also offers an externship program with more than 50 students at any one time placed in externships, and more than 85% of MC Law students completing an externship or working part-time in the legal field prior to graduation.  In addition, since 2010, the Law School offers a one-year LL.M. degree in U.S. legal studies for students holding law degrees from foreign law programs.  In 2020, MC Law students posted a bar passage statistic in the state of Mississippi of higher than 86% first time passage rate.

In addition, each summer, MC Law offers students study abroad programs in France, Cuba, Germany, Mexico, and South Korea. MC Law was one of the first U.S. law schools to offer a program in Cuba.

Employment
According to MC Law's official 2021 ABA-required disclosures, 69.6% of the Class of 2021 obtained full-time, long-term, JD-required employment within nine months after graduation, and 10.9% were not yet employed in some capacity by that time.

Costs
Fall/Spring (30 HRS.)

Tuition $33,370

Fees $1,640

Books & Supplies $1,500

Room & Board $12,375

Transportation $3,600

Personal/Misc. $4,050

Total $55,155

2022 entering class
Enrollment : 126
75th Percentile LSAT: 154
Median LSAT : 150GPA Median : 3.38Average Age: 25Women 	: 50%Minorities : 20.4%Out of State students : 51%Undergraduate Schools Represented''' : 59

Notable alumni
Jenifer Branning (2004) - Republican member of the Mississippi State Senate.
Jennifer Riley Collins (1999) - Executive Director of the Mississippi ACLU
Stephen Dillard (1996) - Chief Judge of the Georgia Court of Appeals
Joey Fillingane (1998) - Mississippi State Senator 2007–Present 
Robert Hurt (1995) - member, United States House of Representatives for Virginia’s 5th District 2012–2017
L. Joseph Lee (1973) - Chief Judge of the Mississippi Court of Appeals from 2011-2018.
Rebecca Tedford Partington (1986) - Deputy of the Rhode Island Attorney General's Civil Rights Division (1996-2020)
Amy Tuck (1989) - Lieutenant Governor, Mississippi
William F. Winter - Former Governor of Mississippi, honorary degree

See also
 Mississippi College main campus in Clinton, Mississippi

References

External links
 MC Law homepage

Private universities and colleges in Mississippi
Law schools in Mississippi
Universities and colleges in the Jackson metropolitan area, Mississippi
Mississippi College
Education in Jackson, Mississippi
1930 establishments in Mississippi